Demet is a Turkish feminine given name and is from the Greek goddess Demeter. Other variations of Demet include Demetri, Dem, Demetria, Demetra, Metra and Demi; the common diminutive form of the name is also used as a nickname for Demet.

People with the given name include
 Demet Akalın (born 1972), Turkish  pop folk singer, former model
 Demet Akbağ (born 1959), Turkish theatre and film actress
 Demet Bozkurt (born 1996), Turkish women's footballer
 Demet Demir (born 1961), Turkish activist
 Demet Evgar (born 1980), Turkish actress
 Demet Mutlu, Turkish businesswoman
 Demet Müftüoğlu (born 1974), Turkish artist
 Demet Özdemir (born 1992), Turkish actress
 Demet Sağıroğlu (born 1966), Turkish pop music singer
 Demet Şener (born 1977), Turkish actress and former model

Turkish feminine given names